Brooke Queenan (born April 10, 1984) is an American retired professional basketball player. She played the power forward position, last for WBC Bnot Hertzeliya in Israel. With ŽKK Partizan she won national Championship (2012–13), national Cup (2012–13) and Adriatic League Women (2012–13).

Boston College statistics

Source

References

External links
 Brooke Queenan at eurobasket.com

1984 births
Living people
American expatriate basketball people in Belarus
American expatriate basketball people in Greece
American expatriate basketball people in Hungary
American expatriate basketball people in Israel
American expatriate basketball people in Serbia
American expatriate basketball people in Turkey
American women's basketball players
Basketball players from Pennsylvania
Boston College Eagles women's basketball players
Chicago Sky players
Connecticut Sun players
New York Liberty draft picks
People from West Chester, Pennsylvania
Sportspeople from Chester County, Pennsylvania
ŽKK Partizan players
Power forwards (basketball)